Volker Haucke (born 29 June 1968 in Berleburg, now Bad Berleburg, Germany) is a biochemist and cell biologist. He is Director of the Leibniz-Forschungsinstitut für Molekulare Pharmakologie Berlin (FMP) Berlin and Professor of Molecular Pharmacology at the Institute for Pharmacy of the Free University of Berlin.

Biography 
Volker Haucke studied biochemistry at the Free University of Berlin and at the Biozentrum of the University of Basel (1989-1994) as a scholar of the German National Merit Foundation Studienstiftung des deutschen Volkes. In 1997, he was awarded a PhD ("summa cum laude") in biochemistry by the University of Basel (Biozentrum) for his work in the laboratory of Gottfried Schatz on the mitochondrial protein import machinery. From 1997 to 2000 he was a postdoctoral fellow in the research group Pietro De Camilli at Yale University School of Medicine and the Howard Hughes Medical Institute (HHMI) funded by long-term fellowships from the Human Frontier Science Programme Organization (HFSP) and the European Molecular Biology Organization (EMBO). Since 2000 he led an independent research group funded by the Deutsche Forschungsgemeinschaft at the Centre for Biochemistry and Molecular Cell Biology at the University of Göttingen. In 2003, he became chair of the Department of Membrane Biochemistry at the Free University of Berlin. Since 2007, he is a member of the NeuroCure Cluster of Excellence. Haucke was spokesperson of the Collaborative Research Centres (SFB) 449 (Structure and Function of Membrane Integral Receptors, 2008-2010) and 958 (Scaffolding of Membranes - Molecular Mechanisms and Cellular Functions, 2011–2012, since 2012 Deputy Spokesperson.)
Since 2012, Volker Haucke is Director of the Leibniz-Forschungsinstitut für Molekulare Pharmakologie (FMP) in Berlin and Professor (W3-S) of Molecular Pharmacology at the Freie Universität Berlin. At the FMP, he heads the Department of Molecular Pharmacology and Cell Biology. 
From 2008 to 2016 he was an elected member of the review board biochemistry of the German Research Foundation (DFG) and from 2007 to 2012 a member of the editorial board of the Journal of Biological Chemistry. He is currently a member of the editorial boards of EMBO Reports and Biology of the Cell, a member of the scientific advisory board of the open access platform Matters as well as a member of Faculty of 1000. For his work, he has received numerous awards. Since 2014 Haucke is an elected member of the European Molecular Biology Organization (EMBO) and since 2017 a member of the National Academy of Sciences Leopoldina. In 2017 he received the Avanti Award of the American Society for Biochemistry and Molecular Biology (ASBMB) and was awarded funding within the Reinhart-Koselleck program of the DFG. Volker Haucke is married and has two daughters.

Research interests 
Volker Haucke and his group study endocytosis and exocytosis, the uptake of substances into and their release from cells via membrane-bound vesicles, especially in nerve cells. A further focus of his research is the elucidation of the mechanisms of intracellular membrane traffic in the endosomal and lysosomal system and its control by specific membrane lipids, so-called phosphoinositides. A specific focus of his research is the development of tools that target these processes and the development of high-resolution light microscopy techniques, with which these processes can be visualized directly in cells. His most important discoveries include the dissection of the mechanisms that control the recycling of neurotransmitter-containing synaptic vesicles 
and the development of the first selective inhibitors of clathrin-based cellular uptake processes. 
Moreover, Volker Haucke and his team have been able to identify signaling lipids and the enzymes that metabolize them that are of central importance for cellular transport processes and for the question of membrane identity, and, thus, the function of intracellular compartments. Loss or impairment of the activity or function of these enzymes can result in severe diseases that range from inherited muscle disorders via cancer to neurological and neurodegenerative disorders.

Scientific affiliations 
 Member and Principal Investigator, Exzellenzcluster EXC 257 NeuroCure
 Founding Chair and Member, SFB 958 Scaffolding of Membranes
 Member, SFB 740 Functional Protein Modules
 Member, Helmholtz International Research School Molecular Neurobiology at Max-Delbrück-Zentrum Berlin (MDC)
 Member, TransCard Research School at MDC
 Member, American Society for Cell Biology, Bethesda, USA (ASCB)
 Member, American Society for Biochemistry & Molecular Biology (ASBMB)
 Member, Society for Neuroscience, Washington D.C. (SFN) 
 Member, Federation of European Biochemical Societies (FEBS)
 Member, German Society for Biochemistry & Molecular Biology, Frankfurt, (GBM)
 Member, German Society for Cell Biology (DGZ), Heidelberg

Honors 
 2017 Elected Member of The German National Academy of Sciences, Leopoldina
 2017 Avanti Award of the American Society for Biochemistry & Molecular Biology (ASBMB) 2017
 2016 Reinhart-Koselleck-Award of the Deutsche Forschungsgemeinschaft (DFG)
 2014 Elected Member, European Molecular Biology Organization (EMBO)
 2003 Young Investigator Award (YIP), European Molecular Biology Organization
 1998 Long-Term Fellowship Award, Human Frontier Science Program
 1997 Long-Term Fellowship Award, European Molecular Biology Organization
 1994 Boehringer Ingelheim Fellow
 1993 Dr. Carl-Duisberg-Foundation Scholar
 1990–1993 Scholarship Holder of the Studienstiftung des deutschen Volkes

Video 
 Video on Volker Haucke's research (Latest Thinking)

References

External links 
 Homepage of the Leibniz-Forschungssinstitut für Molekulare Pharmakologie
 List of publications of Volker Haucke
 Volker Haucke at the Leibniz-Forschungsinstitut für Molekulare Pharmakologie

German biochemists
Physicians of the Charité
Academic staff of the Free University of Berlin
University of Basel alumni
Free University of Berlin alumni
1968 births
Living people
Members of the German Academy of Sciences Leopoldina
Members of the European Molecular Biology Organization
European Research Council grantees
Studienstiftung alumni